The Dutchman's Cap may refer to:

Bac Mòr;
Olando kepurė.